Mazurek may refer to:

 Mazurek (surname) (includes a list of people with the name)
 Mazurek (cake), a traditional Polish Easter cake
 Mazurek was the sloop used by Krystyna Chojnowska-Liskiewicz for her circumnavigation
 Polish name for the Mazurka, a dance and type of music
 "Dąbrowski's Mazurka" (Mazurek Dąbrowskiego), the Polish national anthem, written by Józef Wybicki in 1797

See also
 
 Mazur (disambiguation)